Powerhouse is a video game developed and published by Impressions for the PC.

Gameplay
Powerhouse is a simulation in which the player runs a power utility, and must compete to be the first to establish a regional electrical infrastructure.

Reception

Next Generation reviewed the PC version of the game, rating it four stars out of five, and stated that "Looking at the mind-boggling array of charts and graphs in the game will provide some answers, but when all is said and done, making those decisions is up to you, and that's where the real fun in this economic simulation lies." Noting the game's steep learning curve, Computer Game Review concluded, "Strategy gamers should get a charge from it, others might get shocked."

Reviews
PC Gamer Vol. 2 No. 9 (1995 September)
Computer Gaming World (Oct, 1995)
PC Games - Aug, 1995
PC Player - Aug, 1995

References

1995 video games
Business simulation games
Impressions Games games
Video games developed in the United Kingdom
Windows games
Windows-only games